The List of hospitals in Ecuador are shown below:
San Juan de Dios Hospital (Quito), 15651974

References

Hospitals
Ecuador
Ecuador